Porphyrins are a group of heterocyclic macrocycle organic compounds, composed of four modified pyrrole subunits interconnected at their α carbon atoms via methine bridges (=CH−). The parent of porphyrins is porphine, a rare chemical compound of exclusively theoretical interest. Substituted porphines are called porphyrins. With a total of 26 π-electrons, of which 18 π-electrons form a planar, continuous cycle, the porphyrin ring structure is often described as aromatic. One result of the large conjugated system is that porphyrins typically absorb strongly in the visible region of the electromagnetic spectrum, i.e. they are deeply colored. The name "porphyrin" derives from the Greek word πορφύρα (porphyra), meaning purple.

Complexes of porphyrins

Concomitant with the displacement of two N-H protons, porphyrins bind metal ions in the N4 "pocket". The metal ion usually has a charge of 2+ or 3+. A schematic equation for these syntheses is shown:
H2porphyrin + [MLn]2+ → M(porphyrinate)Ln−4 + 4 L + 2 H+, where M = metal ion and L = a ligand

The insertion of the metal center is slow in the absence of catalysts.  In nature, these catalysts (enzymes) are called chelatases.  When there is no metal ion (or atom) bound to the nitrogens in the center, then the compounds are called free porphine or free porphyrin.  If they are bonded to a metal in the center, then they are bound.  A porphyrin with an iron atom of the type found in myoglobin, hemoglobin, or certain cytochromes is called heme.  
Metal complexes derived from porphyrins, often called metalloporphyins, occur naturally. One of the best-known families of porphyrin complexes is heme, the pigment in red blood cells, a cofactor of the protein hemoglobin.  Porphin is the simplest porphyrin, a rare compound of theoretical interest.

Ancient porphyrins
A geoporphyrin, also known as a petroporphyrin, is a porphyrin of geologic origin. They can occur in crude oil, oil shale, coal, or sedimentary rocks. Abelsonite is possibly the only geoporphyrin mineral, as it is rare for porphyrins to occur in isolation and form crystals.

The field of organic geochemistry had its origins in the isolation of porphyrins from petroleum. This finding helped establish the biological origins of petroleum. Petroleum is sometimes "fingerprinted" by analysis of trace amounts of nickel and vanadyl porphyrins.

Biosynthesis
In non-photosynthetic eukaryotes such as animals, insects, fungi, and protozoa, as well as the α-proteobacteria group of bacteria, the committed step for porphyrin biosynthesis is the formation of δ-aminolevulinic acid (δ-ALA, 5-ALA or dALA) by the reaction of the amino acid glycine with succinyl-CoA from the citric acid cycle. In plants, algae, bacteria (except for the α-proteobacteria group) and archaea, it is produced from glutamic acid via glutamyl-tRNA and glutamate-1-semialdehyde. The enzymes involved in this pathway are glutamyl-tRNA synthetase, glutamyl-tRNA reductase, and glutamate-1-semialdehyde 2,1-aminomutase. This pathway is known as the C5 or Beale pathway.

Two molecules of dALA are then combined by porphobilinogen synthase to give porphobilinogen (PBG), which contains a pyrrole ring. Four PBGs are then combined through deamination into hydroxymethyl bilane (HMB), which is hydrolysed to form the circular tetrapyrrole uroporphyrinogen III. This molecule undergoes a number of further modifications. Intermediates are used in different species to form particular substances, but, in humans, the main end-product protoporphyrin IX is combined with iron to form heme. Bile pigments are the breakdown products of heme.

The following scheme summarizes the biosynthesis of porphyrins, with references by EC number and the OMIM database. The porphyria associated with the deficiency of each enzyme is also shown:

Laboratory synthesis

A common synthesis for porphyrins is the Rothemund reaction, first reported in 1936, which is also the basis for more recent methods described by Adler and Longo. The general scheme is a condensation and oxidation process starting with pyrrole and an aldehyde.

Applications

Photodynamic therapy
Porphyrins have been evaluated in the context of photodynamic therapy (PDT) since they strongly absorb light, which is then converted to heat in the illuminated areas. This technique has been applied in macular degeneration using verteporfin.

PDT is considered a noninvasive cancer treatment, involving the interaction between light of a determined frequency, a photo-sensitizer, and oxygen. This interaction produces the formation of a highly reactive oxygen species (ROS), usually singlet oxygen, as well as superoxide anion, free hydroxyl radical, or hydrogen peroxide. These high reactive oxygen species react with susceptible cellular organic biomolecules such as; lipids, aromatic amino acids, and nucleic acid heterocyclic bases, to produce oxidative radicals that damage the cell, possibly inducing apoptosis or even necrosis.

Toxicology 
Heme biosynthesis is used as biomarker in environmental toxicology studies. While excess production of porphyrins indicate organochlorine exposure, lead inhibits ALA dehydratase enzyme.

Biological applications 
Porphyrins have been investigated as possible anti-inflammatory agents and evaluated on their anti-cancer and anti-oxidant activity. Several porphyrin-peptide conjugates were found to have antiviral activity against HIV in vitro.

Potential applications

Biomimetic catalysis
Although not commercialized, metalloporphyrin complexes are widely studied as catalysts for the oxidation of organic compounds. Particularly popular for such laboratory research are complexes of meso-tetraphenylporphyrin and octaethylporphyrin. Complexes with Mn, Fe, and Co catalyze a variety of reactions of potential interest in organic synthesis. Some complexes emulate the action of various heme enzymes such as cytochrome P450, lignin peroxidase. Metalloporphyrins are also studied as catalysts for water splitting, with the purpose of generating molecular hydrogen and oxygen for fuel cells.

Molecular electronics and sensors
Porphyrin-based compounds are of interest as possible components of molecular electronics and photonics. Synthetic porphyrin dyes have been incorporated in prototype dye-sensitized solar cells.

Metalloporphyrins have been investigated as sensors.

Phthalocyanines, which are structurally related to porphyrins, are used in commerce as dyes and catalysts, but porphyrins are not.

Supramolecular chemistry

Porphyrins are often used to construct structures in supramolecular chemistry. These systems take advantage of the Lewis acidity of the metal, typically zinc. An example of a host–guest complex that was constructed from a macrocycle composed of four porphyrins. A guest-free base porphyrin is bound to the center by coordination with its four-pyridine substituents.

Theoretical interest in aromaticity
Porphyrinoid macrocycles can show variable aromaticity. An Hückel aromatic porphyrin is porphycene. antiaromatic, Mobius aromatic, and non aromatic porphyrinoid macrocycles are known.

Gallery

Related species

In nature

Several heterocycles related to porphyrins are found in nature, almost always bound to metal ions. These include

Synthetic
A benzoporphyrin is a porphyrin with a benzene ring fused to one of the pyrrole units. e.g. verteporfin is a benzoporphyrin derivative.

Non-natural porphyrin isomers

The first synthetic porphyrin isomer was reported by Emanual Vogel and coworkers in 1986.  This isomer [18]porphyrin-(2.0.2.0) is named as porphycene, and the central N4 Cavity forms a rectangle shape as shown in figure. Porphycenes showed interesting photophysical behavior and found versatile compound towards the photodynamic therapy. This inspired Vogel and Sessler to took up the challenge of preparing [18]porphyrin-(2.1.0.1) and named it as corrphycene or porphycerin. The third porphyrin that is [18]porphyrin-(2.1.1.0), was reported by Callot and Vogel-Sessler. Vogel and coworkers reported successful isolation of [18]porphyrin-(3.0.1.0) or isoporphycene. The Japanese scientist Furuta and Polish scientist Latos-Grażyński almost simultaneously reported the N-confused porphyrins. The inversion of one of the pyrrolic subunits in the macrocyclic ring resulted to face one of the nitrogen atom outside of the core of the macrocycle.

See also 
 A porphyrin-related disease: porphyria
 Porphyrin coordinated to iron: heme
 A heme-containing group of enzymes: Cytochrome P450
 Porphyrin coordinated to magnesium: chlorophyll
 The one-carbon-shorter analogues: corroles, including vitamin B12, which is coordinated to a cobalt
 Corphins, the highly reduced porphyrin coordinated to nickel that binds the Cofactor F430 active site in methyl coenzyme M reductase (MCR)
 Nitrogen-substituted porphyrins: phthalocyanine

References

External links 

 Journal of Porphyrins and Phthalocyanines
 Handbook of Porphyrin Science
 Porphynet – an informative site about porphyrins and related structures

Biomolecules
Metabolism
Photosynthetic pigments
Chelating agents